Dyer's case (1414) 2 Hen. V, fol. 5, pl. 26 is an old English contract law case concerning restraint of trade and the doctrine of consideration.

Facts
Mr. John Dyer had given a promise to not exercise his trade in the same town as the plaintiff for six months but the plaintiff had promised nothing in return. The plaintiff had not bothered to attend court for the hearing.

Judgment
On hearing the plaintiff's attempt to enforce this restraint, Hull J exclaimed,

See also
Consideration in English law
Privity in English law
Non-compete clause

Notes

English consideration case law
1410s in law
1414 in England